Annimangalam is a village in the Ariyalur taluk of Ariyalur district, Tamil Nadu, India.

Demographics 

 census, Annimangalam had a total population of 3185 with 1569 males and 1616 females. Annimangalam have a very good natural things in this village. Annimangalam is the most formers area in the Ariyalur Dist. Near that village Kollidam river is going on.
This village is famous for farming sugarcanes.

References 

Villages in Ariyalur district